Sussan Penelope Ley (pron. , "Susan Lee"; ; born  14 December 1961) is an Australian politician who has been deputy leader of the Liberal Party and Deputy Leader of the Opposition since May 2022. She has been member of parliament (MP) for the New South Wales seat of Farrer since 2001 and was a cabinet minister in the Abbott, Turnbull and Morrison governments.

Ley was born in Nigeria to English parents. She grew up in the UAE and England before moving to Australia as a teenager. Prior to entering politics she worked as a commercial pilot, farmer and public servant based in Albury, New South Wales. Ley was elected to the House of Representatives at the 2001 federal election. She was a parliamentary secretary in the Howard government and became a senior opposition frontbencher following the government's defeat in 2007. In the Abbott and Turnbull governments, Ley held the ministerial portfolios of Assistant Minister for Education (2013–2014), Minister for Health (2014–2016), Sport (2014–2017), Aged Care (2015–2016), and Health and Aged Care (2016–2017). She resigned from the ministry in January 2017 following a controversy over her travel expense claims, but returned in August 2018 when Scott Morrison succeeded Malcolm Turnbull as prime minister. She subsequently served as Assistant Minister for Regional Development and Territories (2018–2019) and Minister for the Environment prior to the government's defeat at the 2022 federal election. In the 47th Australian Parliament, Ley represents the Opposition in the roles of Shadow Minister for Women, Industry, Skills and Training, as well as Small and Family Business.

Early years and background
Ley was born on 14 December 1961 in Kano, Kano State, Federation of Nigeria. The daughter of English parents, her family moved to the United Arab Emirates when she was one year old, where her father worked as a British intelligence officer. Ley attended boarding school in England until she was 13, when her family migrated to Australia. Her parents bought a hobby farm in Toowoomba, but quickly sold it due to a crash in beef prices. They then moved to Canberra, where her father worked for the Australian Federal Police. She was educated at Campbell High School, Dickson College, La Trobe University, the University of New South Wales and Charles Sturt University, and has master's degrees in taxation and accountancy.

When Ley was 19 she enrolled in flight school and gained her commercial pilot's licence when she was 20. She has worked as a waitress and cleaner, and trained as an air traffic controller, but did not complete the course. She did become a commercial pilot, and was later a farmer and shearers' cook. She met John Ley while aerial stock-mustering in south-west Queensland. They married in 1987, settled on her husband's family farm in north-east Victoria, and had three children before their 2004 divorce. Ley was Director of Technical Training at the Australian Taxation Office in Albury from 1995 to 2001 before entering politics.

Politics
Ley joined the Liberal Party's Tallangatta branch in 1994.

Government (2001–2007)

Ley was elected to the House of Representatives at the 2001 election, winning the New South Wales seat of Farrer for the Liberal Party following the retirement of former National Party leader and deputy prime minister Tim Fischer. At the time of her election she was living across the border in Old Tallangatta, Victoria, and had recently lost Liberal preselection for the Victorian seat of Indi to Sophie Mirabella. She campaigned in "a large caravan, brightly painted in Liberal blue", ultimately winning a narrow victory on preferences.

In the Howard government, Ley was appointed Parliamentary Secretary (Children and Youth Affairs) in October 2004 and Parliamentary Secretary for Agriculture, Fisheries and Forestry in January 2006.

Opposition (2007–2013)

Following the 2007 election, Ley was appointed Shadow Minister for Housing and Shadow Minister for Status of Women by Opposition Leader, Dr Brendan Nelson, moving to Shadow Minister for Customs and Justice when Malcolm Turnbull became Opposition Leader in September 2008.

When Tony Abbott became Opposition Leader in December 2009 she was given the portfolio of Shadow Assistant Treasurer and was moved to Shadow Minister for Employment Participation and Shadow Minister for Childcare and Early Childhood Learning after the 2010 election.

Abbott and Turnbull Governments (2013–2018)

In September 2013, following the Coalition's victory at the 2013 federal election, Ley was appointed Assistant Minister for Education in the Abbott Government, with responsibility for childcare. Following a ministerial reshuffle, she was promoted to cabinet in December 2014 as Minister for Health and Minister for Sport. She was also made Minister for Aged Care in September 2015 following the replacement of Tony Abbott with Malcolm Turnbull.

In January 2017, an examination of Ley's expenditure claims and travel entitlements revealed she had purchased an apartment on the Gold Coast, close to the business premises of her partner, for $795,000 while on official business in Queensland. Ley defended the purchase, saying her work in the Gold Coast was legitimate, that all travel had been within the rules for entitlements, and that the purchase of the apartment "was not planned nor anticipated" (a claim which was widely derided). On 8 January, Ley released a statement acknowledging that the purchase had changed the context of her travel, and undertaking to repay the government for the cost of the trip in question as well as three others. The Sydney Morning Herald reported that Ley had made 27 taxpayer-funded trips to the Gold Coast in recent years.

On 9 January 2017, Ley announced that she would stand aside from her ministerial portfolios until an investigation into her travel expenses was completed by the Department of Prime Minister and Cabinet. She announced that she would not be making her diaries public. On 13 January 2017, Prime Minister Malcolm Turnbull announced that Ley had resigned from the ministry. Greg Hunt was appointed as Ley's replacement as the Minister for Health and Sport, and Ken Wyatt was appointed Assistant Minister for Health and Minister for Indigenous Health and Aged Care, both with effect from 24 January 2017.

Morrison Government (2018–2022)
During the 2018 Liberal leadership spills, Ley reportedly voted for Peter Dutton against Malcolm Turnbull in the first vote. She subsequently signed the petition requesting to hold a further party meeting to determine the leadership of the Liberal party, and again voted for Dutton against Scott Morrison in the second spill days later, which saw Morrison replace Turnbull as prime minister.

On 26 August 2018, Ley was appointed Assistant Minister for Regional Development and Territories in the Morrison Government. In May 2019, following the party's victory at the 2019 election, she replaced Melissa Price as Minister for the Environment.

Since 2020, Ley has been a member of the Global Leaders Group on Antimicrobial Resistance, co-chaired by Sheikh Hasina and Mia Mottley.

In March 2022, Ley successfully appealed a Federal Court ruling that she had a "duty of care to children to consider climate change harm when approving coal mines".

Also in March 2022, Ley approved a Coalition decision to scrap 176 out of 185 recovery plans designed to prevent the extinction of threatened species and habitats, including the Tasmanian devil. This was despite a government call for feedback, which received 6701 responses, all disagreeing with the proposed removal of the recovery plans.

Opposition (2022–present)
Following the Coalition's defeat at the 2022 election, it was reported that Ley would be a candidate to replace Josh Frydenberg as deputy leader of the party, following his electoral defeat. Ley was elected unopposed on 30 May 2022.

In July 2022, Environment Minister Tanya Plibersek accused former Environment Minister Sussan Ley of hiding a document that was handed to the coalition government in December 2021, ahead of the 2022 Australian federal election. The document outlined the poor and declining health of the Australian ecosystem. "It tells a story of crisis and decline in Australia's environment [and] of a decade of government inaction and wilful ignorance," Ms Plibersek said.

In August 2022, ahead of the Jobs and Skills Summit of Australia, Sussan Ley falsely stated that no one in the world is making an electric ute. "We know we're not going to have electric vehicles tomorrow," Ms Ley said. "And no one in the world is making an electric ute, by the way, and even if they were it would be unaffordable." While car manufacturer LDV Group already has an electric ute on the market in New Zealand, it is likely to be available for purchase in Australia soon. In fact, well known car manufacturers including Ford Motor Company, Tesla Motors and Hummer all produce electric utes, while lesser-known companies such as Rivian, Great Wall Motor and Fisker Automotive also have an electric ute on the market. Australian company ACE EV Group is also developing the ACE Yewt. A spokesperson for Ms Ley said that when Ms Ley said 'no one in the world is making an electric ute' what she meant was that, "EV utes are not yet commercially available in Australia and even if EV utes arrived here overnight, cost-effective models — which invariably have lower distance ranges — are not yet suitable for practical use in rural and regional Australia."

Political positions
In March 2021, The Sydney Morning Herald stated that Ley was a member of the centre-right faction of the Liberal Party. However, in May 2022 ABC News reported that she was "not aligned with the conservative or moderate factions".

In 2011, Ley publicly supported the admission of the State of Palestine to the United Nations and was reported to be a member of the cross-party Parliamentary Friends of Palestine group.

In May 2018 Ley introduced a private member's bill to ban the live export of sheep.

Ley identifies as a feminist.

References

External links

 

1961 births
Living people
Liberal Party of Australia members of the Parliament of Australia
Members of the Australian House of Representatives
Members of the Australian House of Representatives for Farrer
University of New South Wales alumni
Women members of the Australian House of Representatives
La Trobe University alumni
Charles Sturt University alumni
English emigrants to Australia
Government ministers of Australia
Naturalised citizens of Australia
Politicians from Kano
People from Dubai
Abbott Government
Turnbull Government
21st-century Australian politicians
21st-century Australian women politicians
Women government ministers of Australia
People educated at Dickson College
Commercial aviators
Morrison Government
Australian women commercial aviators
Australian Ministers for Health